The Percy Parkes Building, is a historic commercial building in Carmel-by-the-Sea, California. It was built and designed in 1926, by Earl Percy Parkes as a retail shop. It is an example of a  Spanish Colonial Revival style building. The structure is recognized as an important commercial building in the city's Downtown Conservation District Historic Property Survey, and was nominated and submitted to the California Register of Historical Resources on April 25, 2002. The building was recently occupied by Jan De Luz Linens, which is now moved to Dolores Street and 6th Avenue.

History

In 1926, contractor and builder Earl Percy Parkes built, designed, and owned the Spanish Colonial Revival style building on Dolores Street between Ocean Avenue and 7th Avenue in Carmel-by-the-Sea, California.

The original cost, in 1926, to build the  x  store was $6,000.

The building is opposite the Mary Dummage Shop and on the same block as a group of shops along Dolores Street that include the El Paseo Building, Tuck Box, De Yoe Building, Percy Parkes Building, and the Isabel Leidig Building. This group of buildings are some of the most architecturally significant commercial stores in Carmel.

The Percy Parkes Building is a one-story Spanish Colonial Revival architecture-style commercial building constructed of reinforced concrete with a low-pitched Spanish-style clay tile roof with a white stucco wall. The wedge-shaped entrance has two large show windows with two Dutch doors that lead to two identical shops. Awnings were installed that cover the windows and the main entrance doors. The roof line is the same height as the adjacent W. C. Farley Building to the north.

This property has been the home of many businesses over the years. It was the site of George Vining's Meat Market starting in 1928, and the Mingo's Carmel Grocery Store in 1949, Amond Beauty Parolor in 1963, Carmel Vintage Shop in 1970, Village Artistry in 1987, and Soto's Deco'rations antique store in 1996. Several additions and remodeling’s took place over the years. In 1943, a shed addition was constructed to the rear of the building by Michael J. Murphy for $200. The interior partition was remodeled in 1980 for $3,000. In 1987, an interior remodel was done for $5,200. In 1996, another interior remodel was done for $12,000.

The building qualifies for inclusion in the city's Downtown Conservation District Historic Property Survey, and has been nominated and submitted to the California Register of Historical Resources on April 25, 2002. The property is significant under the California Register criterion 3, in the area of architecture as an example of the  Spanish Colonial Revival style and work of builder Earl Percy Parkes. This building is part of a block of commercial buildings on Dolores Street between Ocean Avenue and 7th Avenue that demonstrate Carmel's historic commercial development in the 1920s.

See also
List of Historic Buildings in Carmel-by-the-Sea

References

External links

 Downtown Conservation District Historic Property Survey

1926 establishments in California
Carmel-by-the-Sea, California
Buildings and structures in Monterey County, California